Direct action (PA) is a Slovak trade union, which focuses on solving problems in the workplace and at home and on organizing solidarity actions for the rights and needs of workers. The union was established in 2000 and became a section of the International Workers' Association (IWA).

Ideology and principles
The organization adheres to anarcho-syndicalist principles, and in its activities is primarily focused on organizing dissatisfied workers, in order to enforce their requirements. It criticizes classical unions for their excessive bureaucracy, inefficiency, efforts for class collaboration between capital and the working class, and a tendency to avoid open conflict. As an alternative to traditional unions, it offers radical unions without hierarchical structures and without paid officials, which are governed by a membership base and promote their interests through direct action.

Primary goals 
Direct action emphasizes the following objectives:
Promote the current interests of the members, to solve their problems in the form of direct actions and to assist any worker who so requests.
Express solidarity with workers in disputes regardless of their country, to provide them with assistance from as many people as possible and to contribute to greater unity among workers.
Build an organization composed of individuals and independent groups operating in the place of residence (local groups), in individual sectors (sector groups) and in specific companies (groups in the workplace).
The long-term goal of the union is such an organization of society in which society and labor are exempt from capital and the state.

Activities
The organization criticizes the efforts of state authorities to label any critic of the social order as an extremist and has in the past commented on efforts to limit the right of assembly. The union has repeatedly supported teachers' struggle for higher wages.

References

External links 

 Website
 Facebook

Anarchism in Slovakia
Trade unions in Slovakia
International Workers' Association
Syndicalist trade unions